Fiber cable termination is the addition of connectors to each optical fiber in a cable. The fibers need to have connectors fitted before they can attach to other equipment. Two common solutions for fiber cable termination are pigtails and fanout kits or breakout kits.

Pigtails
A fiber pigtail is a single, short, usually tight-buffered, optical fiber that has an optical connector pre-installed on one end and a length of exposed fiber at the other end. 

The end of the pigtail is stripped and fusion spliced to a single fiber of a multi-fiber trunk. Splicing of pigtails to each fiber in the trunk "breaks out" the multi-fiber cable into its component fibers for connection to the end equipment.  

Pigtails can have female or male connectors. Female connectors could be mounted in a patch panel, often in pairs although single-fiber solutions exist, to allow them to be connected to endpoints or other fiber runs with patch fibers.  Alternatively they can have male connectors and plug directly into an optical transceiver.

Fanout kit (breakout kit)
A fanout kit is a set of empty jackets designed to protect fragile tight-buffered strands of fiber from a cable. This allows the individual fibers to be terminated without splicing, and without needing a protective enclosure such as a splicebox. This is normally an option with fiber distribution cable, or sometimes loose-buffer or ribbon cable, because these types of cable contain multiple strands that are designed for a permanent termination. The ribbon fanout pigtails include: Ribbon cable, Fanout kit, Fanout tubing and Connectors.

Zip-cord style jackets, including those that contain Aramid yarn as the strength member, can be slipped over multiple fiber strands coming out of a loose buffer cable to convert it to a complete set of single-fiber cables that can be directly attached to optical connectors. A plastic boot is normally used for strain relief and protection from moisture. Use of a breakout kit enables a fiber-optic cable containing multiple loose buffer tubes to receive connectors without the splicing of pigtails.

See also
Breakout cable

References

Fiber optics
Telecommunications equipment